The Veleria Dedalo Strike-T is an Italian ultralight trike, designed and produced by Veleria Dedalo of Gradara. The aircraft is supplied complete and ready-to-fly.

Design and development
The Strike-T is a minimalist trike, designed for engine-off soaring.

The aircraft design features a cable-braced hang glider-style high-wing, weight-shift controls, a single-seat open cockpit without a cockpit fairing, tricycle landing gear and a single engine in pusher configuration.

The aircraft is made predominantly from titanium tubing, with the landing gear legs from Ergal. Its double surface wing is covered in Dacron sailcloth, supported by a single tube-type kingpost and uses an "A" frame weight-shift control bar. The nosewheel is fitted with a drum brake. The powerplant is a single cylinder, air-cooled, two-stroke, single-ignition  Cisco C-Max engine.

Designed to fold for ground transport by automobile, it can be rigged for flight in 3 minutes.

A number of different wings can be fitted to the basic carriage, including the A-I-R Atos rigid wing.

Variants
Strike-T
Model made from titanium tubing.
Strike-S
Model made from stainless steel tubing. It is  heavier, but significantly cheaper.

Specifications (Strike-T)

References

External links

Strike
2010s Italian sport aircraft
2010s Italian ultralight aircraft
Single-engined pusher aircraft
Ultralight trikes